Enchanted April is a 1991 British film directed by Mike Newell. The screenplay by Peter Barnes was adapted from Elizabeth von Arnim's 1922 novel The Enchanted April. It stars Miranda Richardson, Josie Lawrence, Polly Walker, and Joan Plowright, with Alfred Molina, Michael Kitchen, and Jim Broadbent in supporting roles.

Plot
Elizabeth von Arnim's novel tells of four dissimilar women in 1920s England who leave their rainy, grey environments to go on holiday in Italy. Mrs. Arbuthnot and Mrs. Wilkins, who belong to the same ladies' club, but have never spoken, become acquainted after reading a newspaper advertisement for a small medieval castle on the shores of the Mediterranean to be let furnished for the month of April. They find some common ground as both are struggling to make the best of unhappy marriages. Having decided to seek other ladies to help share expenses, they reluctantly take on the elegant but peevish elderly Mrs. Fisher, and the stunning, aloof, and very wealthy Lady Caroline Dester. The four women come together at the castle and, after many unexpected twists and turns, find rejuvenation in the tranquil beauty of their surroundings, rediscovering hope and love.

Cast
 Josie Lawrence as Lottie Wilkins
 Miranda Richardson as Rose Arbuthnot
 Polly Walker as Caroline Dester
 Joan Plowright as Mrs. Fisher
 Alfred Molina as Mellersh Wilkins
 Jim Broadbent as Frederick Arbuthnot
 Michael Kitchen as George Briggs

Production
The film was shot on location at Castello Brown in Portofino, Italy, the castle where the author of the book had stayed in the 1920s. The score by Richard Rodney Bennett, featuring flute and oboe themes, evokes the film's mood and accentuates the story's sentimentality and nostalgia.

Reception
The film premiered as the opening night gala of the London Film Festival on 6 November 1991. It gained a positive reaction from critics and holds an 85% rating on Rotten Tomatoes based on 33 reviews. The consensus summarizes: "Mike Newell's adaptation of Elizabeth von Arnim's novel moves at a more generous pace than the 1935 version, allowing excellent performances from Miranda Richardson and Joan Plowright to flourish."

Awards and nominations

See also
An earlier adaptation of the book was released by RKO Radio Pictures in 1935, with the same name Enchanted April.

References

External links
 
 
 
 

1991 films
1991 drama films
British drama films
1990s female buddy films
Films based on British novels
Films directed by Mike Newell
Films featuring a Best Musical or Comedy Actress Golden Globe winning performance
Films featuring a Best Supporting Actress Golden Globe-winning performance
Films scored by Richard Rodney Bennett
Films set in the 1920s
Miramax films
Films set in Liguria
British female buddy films
1990s English-language films
1990s British films